Port Orchard is a city in and the county seat of Kitsap County, Washington, United States. It is located  due west of West Seattle and is connected to Seattle and Vashon Island via the Washington State Ferries run to Southworth. It is named after Port Orchard, the strait that separates Bainbridge Island from the Kitsap Peninsula.

As of the 2010 census the population was 11,144, and in 2019 the population was an estimated 14,597.

History
The first European-Americans to settle in what is now Port Orchard were William Renton and Daniel Howard, who set up a sawmill there in 1854. The town that was to become Port Orchard was originally platted in 1886 by Frederick Stevens, who named the new location after his father, Sidney. The town of Sidney was incorporated September 15, 1890, and was the first in Kitsap County to be both platted and incorporated. Shortly thereafter, the U.S. Navy sought a suitable location for another installation on the West Coast, and found it with the assistance of Sidney's residents in Orchard Bay (this installation would later become the Puget Sound Naval Shipyard in Bremerton).

The county seat was originally in Port Madison, but moved to Sidney after a popular vote in 1892. In December of that same year, the residents of Sidney petitioned both the state legislature and the Post Office Department to rename the city "Port Orchard". The legislature refused, as Charleston (now West Bremerton) had also requested that name. The Post Office Department, however, went through with the name change, and as a result the Port Orchard post office ended up in Sidney, and the Charleston post office ended up in Port Orchard. It wasn't until 1903 that local politician Will Thompson convinced the state legislature to correct this confusing situation, and relocated the Charleston post office to Charleston, at the same time renaming Sidney "Port Orchard", as it is known today.

A new city hall was opened in May 1999, replacing a seismically vulnerable building constructed in 1947. It was to be a catalyst for new development in the city's downtown.

The tornado uprooted trees and damaged up to 450 homes and businesses, some of which sustained total roof loss. Some neighborhoods were evacuated due to reported gas leaks.

Geography
Port Orchard is located in south-central Kitsap County at  (47.531563, -122.638405), on the south side of Sinclair Inlet, an arm of the Port Orchard strait connecting to Puget Sound. The city is bordered to the north across Sinclair Inlet by the city of Bremerton.

Demographics

As of 2000 the median income for a household in the city was $34,020, and the median income for a family was $41,946. Males had a median income of $33,610 versus $25,739 for females. The per capita income for the city was $16,382. About 10.9% of families and 12.9% of the population were below the poverty line, including 17.2% of those under age 18 and 9.1% of those age 65 or over.

2010 census
As of the census of 2010, there were 11,144 people, 4,278 households, and 2,726 families residing in the city. The racial makeup of the city was 80.8% White, 3.4% African American, 1.3% Native American, 5.8% Asian, 1.4% Pacific Islander, 1.0% from other races, and 6.4% from two or more races. Hispanic or Latino of any race were 6.6% of the population.

There were 4,278 households, of which 33.0% had children under the age of 18 living with them, 45.7% were married couples living together, 13.3% had a female householder with no husband present, 4.6% had a male householder with no wife present, and 36.3% were non-families. 27.7% of all households were made up of individuals, and 9.5% had someone living alone who was 65 years of age or older. The average household size was 2.43 and the average family size was 2.96.

The median age in the city was 34.5 years. 23.5% of residents were under the age of 18; 10.4% were between the ages of 18 and 24; 29.1% were from 25 to 44; 23.4% were from 45 to 64; and 13.5% were 65 years of age or older. The gender makeup of the city was 50.3% male and 49.7% female.

Notable people

 Willie Bloomquist, Major League Baseball player
 Delilah, syndicated radio personality
 Jason Ellison, Major League Baseball outfielder
 Jamie Ford, author
 Karolyn Grimes, actress, It's a Wonderful Life
 Jason Hammel, Major League Baseball pitcher
 Debbie Macomber, author 
 Benji Olson, National Football League guard
 Madelaine Petsch, actress
 Jason Wade, Lifehouse lead singer

References

External links

 City of Port Orchard official website
 The Port Orchard Chamber of Commerce
 Kitsap Peninsula Visitor & Convention Bureau - Port Orchard Page
 History of Port Orchard at HistoryLink

 
Cities in Kitsap County, Washington
County seats in Washington (state)
Cities in Washington (state)
Populated places established in 1886